Kollam KSWTD Boat Jetty or Kollam KSWTD Ferry Station is an transport hub in the city of Kollam in Kerala, India, one of 14 ferry stations owned by the Kerala State Water Transport Department.

Importance
Kollam is one of the few cities in Kerala which is reachable by rail, road or water transportation. The city of Kollam (Quilon) was the commercial capital of the princely state of Travancore. Kollam Port was founded by Mar Abo at Tangasseri in 825. The district's major waterways include Ashtamudi Lake, Paravur Kayal, Sasthamcotta Lake and the historic Kollam Canal. The Kerala State Water Transport Department (KSWTD) operates ferries from Kollam to the following destinations:

 Sampranikkodi
 Guhanandapuram
 Pezhumthuruthu
 Muthiraparamb (West Kallada)
 Ayiramthengu
 Munroe Island
 Alappuzha

Location
The KSWTD jetty is situated near Kollam KSRTC Bus Station in Cutchery. The ferry station is situated on the side of Asramam Link Road. Kollam has two gateways to the backwaters of Kerala.

 Kollam Junction railway station - 2.2 km
 Kollam Port - 2.0 km
 Kollam Beach - 3.3 km

Kollam-Alappuzha Tourist Boat Service

The Kollam-Alappuzha route is the longest service operated by KSWTD within Kerala. The eight-hour-long journey passes through Ashtamudi Lake, Kayamkulam Lake and Vembanad Lake and through narrow canals. The route also passes through the settlements in Amritapuri, Tharayilkadavu, Alumkadavu, Kovilthottam, Chavara, Pallikkodi & Kavanad.

See also
 Kollam KSRTC Bus Station
 Kollam Junction railway station
 Andamukkam City Bus Stand
 Kollam Port
 Kerala State Water Transport Department
 Cutchery
 Asramam Link Road

References

External links 

Water transport in Kollam
Ferry terminals in India